François-Antoine Bossuet (21 August 1798 Ypres – 28 September 1889 Saint-Josse-ten-Noode) was a painter and draughtsman of the Belgian school.

Life and work
Bossuet is known for his depictions of the landscapes, cities and monuments of Spain and Italy, with an emphasis on historic places, occasionally with genre scenes of everyday life.  He is noted for the excellence of perspective in his paintings, on which he wrote a dissertation in 1843. 

His fascination with Spain and Italy stemmed from what had become something of a tradition for romantic European painters. Accordingly he visited Andalusía and saw its important buildings like the Alhambra of Granada. 

He was professor at the Academy of Fine Arts in Brussels, from 1855 until 1876. His works may be seen in the Royal Museum of Fine Arts, Antwerp, the Royal Museums of Fine Arts of Belgium in Brussels, and the Victoria and Albert Museum in London.

References

Further reading
 P. & V. Berko, "Dictionary of Belgian painters born between 1750 & 1875", Knokke 1981, p. 58-60.
 P. & V. Berko, "19th Century European Virtuoso Painters", Knokke 2011, p. 494, illustrations p. 212, 236, 237, 238, 470.
 Thieme-Becker, Allgemeines Lexikon der Bildenden Künstler von der Antike bis zur Gegenwart, vol. 4, Leipzig, 1910, p. 408.
 Le Cabinet des Estampes. Trente années d'acquisitions. 1930-1960, catalogue d'exposition, Bruxelles, Bibliothèque royale de Belgique, 1961, p. 67.
 Benezit E., Dictionnaire critique et documentaire des peintres, sculpteurs, dessinateurs et graveurs, Paris, Librairie Gründ, 1976, tome II, p. 198-199.
 Ogonovsky Judith, Bossuet François, dans Le Dictionnaire des Peintres belges du XIVe siècle à nos jours depuis les premiers maîtres des anciens Pays-bas méridionaux et de la Principauté de Liège jusqu'aux artistes contemporains, Bruxelles, La Renaissance du Livre, 1995, p. 109.

External links

 More works by Bossuet @ ArtNet
 Gallery of paintings @ MyStudios

1798 births
1889 deaths
Artists from Ypres
Belgian painters
Draughtsmen
Cityscape artists